HD 46375 b is an extrasolar planet located approximately 109 light-years away in the constellation of Monoceros, orbiting the star HD 46375. With 79 Ceti b on March 29, 2000, it was joint first known extrasolar planet less massive than Saturn orbiting a normal star. The planet is a "hot Jupiter", a type of planet that orbits very close to its parent star. In this case the orbital distance is only a tenth that of the planet Mercury. No transit of the planet has been detected, so its inclination must be less than 83°. Because the inclination is unknown, the true mass of the planet is not known.

References

External links
 
 

Monoceros (constellation)
Exoplanets discovered in 2000
Giant planets
Exoplanets detected by radial velocity
Hot Jupiters

de:HD 46375 b